The New Castle Indians were a minor league baseball team based in New Castle, Pennsylvania, as a member of the Middle Atlantic League. The team began play in 1948 as the New Castle Chiefs. In 1949 and 1950, the team became known as the New Castle Nats and were a Class C minor league affiliate of the Washington Senators. The team finally took up the Indians moniker in 1951, their final season.

Year-by-year record

Baseball teams established in 1948
Sports clubs disestablished in 1951
1948 establishments in Pennsylvania
1951 disestablishments in Pennsylvania
Defunct minor league baseball teams
Defunct baseball teams in Pennsylvania
Professional baseball teams in Pennsylvania
New Castle, Pennsylvania
Washington Senators minor league affiliates
Middle Atlantic League teams
Baseball teams disestablished in 1951